Gregory David Rowlands (10 December 1947 – 15 August 2021) was a New Zealand rugby union player. A fullback, Rowlands represented Bay of Plenty at a provincial level, and was a member of the New Zealand national side, the All Blacks, on their 1976 tour of South America. He played four matches for the All Blacks on the tour including two matches against Argentina, but these were not given full international status by the New Zealand Rugby Union.

Rowlands died in Tauranga on 15 August 2021, aged 73.

References

1947 births
2021 deaths
Rugby union players from Rotorua
People educated at Tauranga Boys' College
New Zealand rugby union players
New Zealand international rugby union players
Bay of Plenty rugby union players
Rugby union fullbacks